Aagar faliya (also known as Malvan aagar faliya) is a small Indus Valley civilisation site, located at Valsad district in Gujarat, India. This site is, sometimes, considered one of the southernmost limits of Indus Valley civilisation, the other one being Daimabad which is located further south.

Period
Period I – Late Harappan and Post Harappan

Period II – Historical pits and temporary occupation.

Excavation
F.R.Allchin and J.P.Joshi (of Archaeological Survey of India) discovered this site during 1967. However, by that time, the site was damaged and major portion of the ancient habitation was already lost.
 
Excavation was undertaken during 1967–68 by ASI and later during 1970 by J.P.Joshi of ASI, his colleagues and Cyrus Guzder of University of Cambridge were involved.

Findings
Number of copper and bronze objects and important findings being a bangle and small rod. Animal findings include sheep, goat, cattle, dog, horse, hog, pig, barasinga and fish. Terracotta humped bulls, circular or bun shaped terracotta cakes, carnelian beads were also found. Jars, bowls, miniature jars with plain bands, hanging interlaced loops both on body and neck were found.

See also

 Indus Valley civilization
 List of Indus Valley Civilization sites
 List of inventions and discoveries of the Indus Valley Civilization
 Hydraulic engineering of the Indus Valley Civilization

References

Indus Valley civilisation sites
Archaeological sites in Gujarat
Former populated places in India
Surat district